Dervla and Derval are female Irish given names, anglicised from  and , respectively.  is a Gaelicised hybrid of the two names.  means 'daughter of the ' [poet]. , a common medieval name, may mean 'daughter of ',  being a poetic name for Ireland; or else 'true desire'.

People with these names include:

Deirbhile, Dervla 
 Darbiled or Deirbhile, an anchoress who founded a monastery at Erris in the sixth century
 Dervla Kirwan (born 1971) Irish actress
 Dervla Murphy (1931-2022) Irish travel writer
 Dervla Burke, musician in the country band Crystal Swing
 Dervla Magennis, contestant in series 1 of The Voice of Ireland

Derbáil, Dearbháil, Dearbhail, Derval 
 Dearbháil iníon Tadhg mac Cathal (died 925), aunt of Cathal mac Conchobair, king of Connacht
 Derval O'Rourke (born 1981), sprint hurdler
 Derval Symes, visual artist

Dearbhla 
 Dearbhla Walsh, film and television director 
 Dearbhla Molloy (born 1946), actress

Fictional
 Dearbhla Dillon, character in the soap opera Fair City
 Dervla Nolan, character in the novel Dead Famous
 Dervla Dove, child character in the novel Flight of the Doves

References

Irish-language feminine given names